Father Muller Medical College, located about a kilometre from the National Highway-66 (the Mumbai-Mangalore highway) at Kankanady in Mangalore, is a religious minority educational institution forming a part of the Father Muller Charitable Institutions (FMCI).

History 
Fr. Muller's Hospital opened its doors to the people of South Canara in 1880. It started when Fr. Augustus Muller S.J, a German Jesuit priest dispensed homeopathic medicines under a Banyan tree. It went on to become a Leprosy hospital (now known as the St Joseph's Leprosy Hospital) and then into a fully fledged hospital. It started the School of Nursing which offered diplomas in General Nursing and Midwifery (GNM) and later College of Nursing which offered degree in Bachelor of Nursing Science.

In 1989, Fr. Muller Institute of Medical Education and Research was duly constituted. Fr. Muller's Institute of Medical Education and Research (FMIMER) started in 1991 with postgraduate courses and then went on to include other courses under its banner, including the Bachelors in Physiotherapy (1994–95), M.Sc in Hospital Administration (1996) and Bachelor of Medicine and Surgery (MBBS) course in 1999. It was thereby was raised to the status of Medical College.

Father Muller college has installed college management software for workflow automation of the entire campus to help the streamline the campus processes and benefit the management, faculty manage the college workflow and students as well as parents to effectively communicate with the management and faculty.

Fr. Muller's also boasts of a beautiful chapel — the St. Joseph's Chapel, inaugurated in 2005 — the post-Centennial silver jubilee year of Fr. Muller Charitable Institutions.

Administration 
The college is fully run by the Diocese of Mangalore with its president being Most Rev. Dr. Peter Paul Saldanha, Bishop Of Mangalore. Others in the administration include:

 Rev Fr.Richard Coelho — Director, F.M.C.I.
 Dr.Anthony Sylvian D'Souza   — Dean
 Rev. Fr. Ajith Menezes — Administrator, Fr. Muller Medical College Hospital

Attached teaching hospitals 
The college is affiliated to Fr. Muller Medical College Hospital. 
They have another attached hospital at Thumbay, Mangalore called Father Muller Hospital, Thumbay which acts as a rural connect as well as post graduate training hospital.
The college rural health care centre is located at Mullerkad, near Kavoor.

Students and interns posted in the Department of Community Medicine undergo postings at public health centres in Surathkal and Jeppu as well as rural hospitals in Belthangady, Badyar in Dakshina Kannada district and Honnavar, Uttara Kannada district.

The college conducts regular health camps from in far-flung areas in and around Dakshina Kannada and Udupi districts.

Undergraduate courses 
The college offers a four-and-a-half-year MBBS course affiliated to Rajiv Gandhi University of Health Sciences with a one-year compulsory rotating internship. There are 150 seats: 40% admissions are through a state level CET, 40% through the COMED-K entrance test, 15% through the NRI quota and 5% through the Management discretionary quota.

The college offers courses in B.P.T. (Bachelors in Physiotherapy), B.Sc. M.L.T. (Medical Laboratory Technology), B.A.S.L.P. (Bachelor in Audiology and Speech-Language Pathology) and B.Sc. Radiography.

Postgraduate courses 
Postgraduate degree (MD/MS) and diploma in specialties which include Medicine, Surgery, Paediatrics, Obstetrics and Gynaecology, ENT, Ophthalmology, Orthopaedics, Radio-diagnosis, Psychiatry and Pathology and master's degree (M.Sc) in Hospital Administration.

Events 
The one event that manages to capture the imagination of the Mullerians is the yearly interclass competition, named "Big Bang" in 2003, "The Quest" in 2004, "The Arena" in 2005, "The Conquest" in 2006, "The Apocalypse" in 2007, "Chakravyuh" in 2008, "Argonautica" in 2009 and "Solaris" in 2010.

Fr. Muller's also conducts an inter-college competition known as the "Mullerfest" annually.

Every year Fr. Muller's holds several events. One was "Deca Fest" in 2010. It concluded on 21 February 2010 after about 30 scheduled events.

The college organises sporting events which include Football, Basketball, Throwball, Volleyball, Badminton, Table-Tennis and athletic meet "Velocity" at interclass and intercollegiate level (RGUHS Mysore Zone tournaments).

As many as 576 students belonging to different streams received degrees during the Graduation Ceremony and Institutions’ Day of Father Muller Charitable Institutions (FMCI) on 13 March 2015.

References

External links
 Fr. Muller Charitable Institutions – Official site
 Department of Psychiatric Nursing — Official site
 Father Muller College of Nursing Silver Jubilee Website

Medical colleges in Karnataka
Universities and colleges in Mangalore
Hospitals in Mangalore
Catholic universities and colleges in India
Colleges affiliated to Rajiv Gandhi University of Health Sciences
1991 establishments in Karnataka
Educational institutions established in 1991